The word "pohoda" means "relax" or "ease" in the Slovak and Czech languages.

Pohoda is an open-air summer music festival in Slovakia, first organized in 1997 in Trenčín. It is the biggest Slovak music event organized annually. The current venue is Trenčín Airport.

The festival features alternative music, rock, pop, dance music, world music, house, techno, drum and bass, hip hop, but also theatre, discussions, chamber music, dance and literature workshops.

The actual record-high attendance is 33,000 people/day from 2009. Since 2010 the festival capacity is limited to 30,000 visitors.

History

1990s

1997 
The first festival organized on 29 June 1997 was called "Kráľovská Pohoda". It took place at the Trenčín town stadium. About 2,000 people attended the event but only 140 tickets were sold. Four Slovak, three Czech and one Russian bands played there.

1998 
The festival called "Dobre zvolená Pohoda" was organized on 5 September. The new location was Pod Sokolicami again in Trenčín, which hosted the event until 2003. The festival had two stages - main and dance. Musicians from Slovakia, the Czech Republic, Poland, Austria and Finland attracted about 3,000 people.

1999 
The event was significantly larger than the previous ones. It was held on 16 and 17 July, contained two stages and accompanying activities, such as tattooing and balloon rides. The first American band, Skulpey, performed at Pohoda. 8,000 people attended the festival each day.

2000s

2000 
The festival organized on 21 and 22 July was significantly larger again. The venue was enlarged by the adjacent expo area. It contained four stages - main, dance 1 and 2 and rock and many accompanying activities and events. Notable performers included Bomfunk MC's and Propellerheads' Will White. 20,000 visitors were present each day.

2001 
Organized on 20 and 21 July, the festival hosted 5 stages - main, rock/hip-hop, rock open-air, and three dance stages. Notable musicians included Fun Lovin' Criminals, and the event attracted 18,000 people each day.

2002 
Seven stages offered a vast array of music genres on 19 and 20 July. Stereo MCs, Sneaker Pimps and Task Force were presented as headliners. Attendance was 20,000/day.

2003 
The festival was organized on 18 and 19 July. Headliners included The Cardigans, Kosheen and Skatalites.

Attendance: 20,000/day

2004 
The festival was moved to a new venue, Trenčín Airport and took place on 16 and 17 July. Notable musicians included Chumbawamba, Moloko, The Wailers, Asian Dub Foundation, and IAMX.

Attendance: 20,000/day

2005 

Organized on 15 and 16 July, the event contained sitwo stages and 2 arena theatres. Headliners included The Prodigy, Garbage, Asian Dub Foundation, Little Louie Vega, Klezmatics, Roots Manuva, and Macka B. The festival attracted a record number of visitors - 25,000/day.

2006 
On July 14 and 15, the headliners and notable musicians included Coldcut, Pixies, The Frames, Danko Jones, Dizzee Rascal, Gogol Bordello, Natacha Atlas, and Stereo MCs.

Attendance: 22,000/day

2007 
The festival took place on 20 and 21 July, and headliners included The Hives, Wu Tang Clan, Basement Jaxx, and Mando Diao.

The event had a record-high attendance with about 27,000 visitors each day.

2008 
The festival took place on July 18 and 19. Headliners for this year were Fatboy Slim, The Streets, Editors, Matthew Herbert Big Band, Unkle, Solomon Burke, Mnozil Brass, Richard Müller, Lou Rhodes, Blood Red Shoes and Audio Bullys.
Other notable musicians were Joan Baez, The Royal Choral Society and Percujove, the Spanish percussion orchestra.

For the first time in the history of Pohoda Festival it reached an attendance of over 30 000 visitors.

2009 
The 2009 festival took place on 16, 17 and 18 July. Percujove, the Spanish percussion orchestra opened the Festival this year. Acts included Basement Jaxx, Patti Smith, Pendulum, The Ting Tings, and High Contrast.

Saturday afternoon concerts of classical music at the main stage have become a tradition. After arias and choruses the Festival have prepared the symbolic fusion of two ensembles this year. A selection of Slavonic Dances (Dvořák), Hungarian Dances (J. Brahms) or Strauss's waltzes was performed by orchestras of the Opera of Slovak National Theatre and Hungarian State Opera.

Travis, the Klaxons and Lamb were scheduled to play, but did not, after the festival was cancelled on Saturday, 18 July after the O2 Aréna tent collapsed due to heavy winds during a thunderstorm. The tent fell on hundreds of people, who took refuge from the rain, killing two  and severely injuring dozens.

The organizers of Pohoda Festival decided that despite the 2009 tragedy, the festival would still return in 2010.

2010s

2010 
The 2010 festival took place on 8, 9 and 10 July, on Trenčín Airport. The most notable artists included The xx, Klaxons, Crystal Castles, José González, Scissor Sisters, Friendly Fires, Digitalism (DJ set), The Stranglers, The Futureheads, New Young Pony Club, Does It Offend You, Yeah?, múm, Autechre, Jape, These New Puritans, Leftfield, Ian Brown and Collegium Musicum. Attendance was limited to 30,000 visitors.

2011 
The Pohoda Festival 2011 took place from Thursday 7 until Saturday 9 July 2011. 
Most notable acts for 2011: Moby, Portishead, Madness, Pulp, Lamb, Peter Bjorn and John, Santigold, M.I.A., Public Image Ltd, Imogen Heap, Rusko, Magnetic Man, Beirut and Dirtyphonics.

2012 
The Pohoda Festival 2012 took place from Thursday 5 until Saturday 7 July 2012. 
Most notable acts for 2012: Kasabian, Lou Reed, Kooks, Elbow, Two Door Cinema Club, Orbital, Anna Calvi, Emilíana Torrini, Aloe Blacc, Public Enemy, Yann Tiersen  and Bat for Lashes.

2013 
The Pohoda Festival 2013 took place from Thursday 11 until Saturday 13 July 2013. 
Most notable acts for 2013: Atoms for Peace, Kaiser Chiefs, Bloc Party, Nick Cave and the Bad Seeds, Smashing Pumpkins, Amon Tobin, Kate Nash, Justice  and Django Django.

2014 
The Pohoda Festival 2014 took place from Thursday 10 until Saturday 12 July 2014. 
Most notable acts for 2014: Kraftwerk, Suede, Kelis, Tame Impala, Travis, Tricky, Azealia Banks, Goldfrapp, Mogwai, Disclosure, Moderat.

2015 
The Pohoda Festival 2015 took place from Thursday 9 until Saturday 11 July 2015. 
Most notable acts for 2015: Björk, Manu Chao, Die Antwoord, FFS, Einstürzende Neubauten, CocoRosie, Eagles of Death Metal, Of Montreal, Kae Tempest.

2016 
Pohoda Festival 2016 took place from Thursday 7 until Saturday 9 July 2016. 
Most notable acts for 2016: The Prodigy, Sigur Rós, PJ Harvey,  James Blake. Parov Stelar,  Flying Lotus, The Vaccines,  Savages,  DJ Shadow.  Róisín Murphy,  Nina Kraviz,  Gogol Bordello.

2017
Pohoda Festival 2017 took place from Thursday 6 July 2017 to Saturday 8 July 2017.
Most notable acts for 2017: Solange, Alt-J, M.I.A., Ylvis, Birdy, The Jesus and Mary Chain, Jake Bugg, Boys Noize, Rodrigo y Gabriela, Slowdive, Future Islands.

2018
Pohoda Festival 2018 took place from Thursday 5 July 2018 to Saturday 7 July 2018. Most notable acts for 2018: The Chemical Brothers, St. Vincent, Jamie Cullum, Blossoms, Everything Everything, Ride, Jessie Ware, Ziggy Marley, Aurora, Rodriguez, LP, Danny Brown.

2019
Pohoda Festival 2019 took place from Thursday 11 July 2019 to Saturday 13 July 2019. Most notable acts for 2019: Liam Gallagher, The 1975, The Roots, Skepta, Charlotte Gainsbourg, Michael Kiwanuka, Mac DeMarco, Mura Masa, Little Big, Lola Marsh.

2020s

2020
The twenty-fourth edition of Pohoda was postponed by a year due to the COVID-19 pandemic. Pohoda 2020 was replaced with Pohoda in the Air, a series of concerts and discussions streamed live from Trenčín Airport on 9-11 July 2020.

2021
Pohoda 2021 was originally supposed to take place from Thursday 8 July 2021 to Saturday 10 July 2021. Most notable acts confirmed for 2020 included FKA Twigs, The Libertines, Wolf Alice, Metronomy,  Archive, Black Midi, Shame and Kokoroko. However, due to the ongoing pandemic and attendance limits on mass events, the event was replaced with a series of five one-day festivals titled Pohoda on the Ground, with the same headliners performing each day. The most notable acts included Dry Cleaning and Altın Gün.

External links and references 
 Official website

References 

Summer festivals
Electronic music festivals in Slovakia
Music festivals established in 1997
Rock festivals in Slovakia
Summer events in Slovakia
Music festivals in Slovakia